Malvern, also known as Oaklands, is a historic home and farm located near Charlottesville, Albemarle County, Virginia. The interior features a side-passage plan on both floors.

It was added to the National Register of Historic Places in 1995.

References

Houses on the National Register of Historic Places in Virginia
Federal architecture in Virginia
Houses completed in 1820
Houses in Albemarle County, Virginia
National Register of Historic Places in Albemarle County, Virginia
1820 establishments in Virginia
Side passage plan architecture in the United States